The British Columbia Pipers Association is a non-profit organization, which sanctions all major bagpipe competitions in British Columbia, Washington, and Oregon.  It frequently joins with Scottish heritage groups and athletic organizations to organize Highland Games in these states.  Nine of these games, plus the Annual Gathering (an indoor piping and drumming competition with no other events) are sanctioned by the BCPA and produce aggregate points in solo piping and drumming, as well as pipe band competition, for an overall Grand Aggregate prize, announced at the end of each competition season.

History 
From the settlement of Vancouver to the association's founding in 1932, there were a few attempts to establish a piping society, all of which had failed shortly after they were founded.  There were a handful of pipe bands, and annual games were put on by the Vancouver St. Andrews & Caledonian Society.  Enthusiasts, who felt that the need for a more concrete organization, founded the BCPA in July 1932.  The first "Annual Gathering" took place in November of that year.

During World War II, several pipers were unable to play for the duration, but several still improved markedly due to regular tuition by the Canadian and Imperial armies and upon demobilization these pipers made a lasting contribution to piping in British Columbia.

Grading Systems in the BCPA 
The first annual gathering of the BCPA saw competitions organized into Novice, Ladies, Under 16, 16 and Over and Open (or Professional) divisions.  This seemed logical at a time when women were thought to be weaker pipers than men.  By the 1950s however, this notion was completely disproved by many excellent female pipers and in 1958 the non-professional competition was reorganized into Novice, Juvenile, Junior and Senior Amateur divisions.  Finally, in 1995, the classes were changed to the more modern Grade 1, 2, 3 and 4, Grade 1 being the highest level, and even more recently Grade 5, beginner (practice chanter/practice pad), and adult (or bandsman) classifications have been added due to the large amount of participation at the lower levels of piping and drumming.

External links 
Home page

Pipe band associations
Music organizations based in Canada